Seipp may refer to:

 Catherine Seipp (1957–2007), media critic and columnist
 Hilde Seipp (1909-1999), German actress
 Seipp's day gecko (Phelsuma seippi)